HMS Calder was a Captain class frigate of the Royal Navy during World War II. It was named after Admiral Sir Robert Calder, Bt. KCB, who was appointed Captain of the Fleet to Admiral John Jervis in 1796, and saw action at the battle of Cape St Vincent on 14 February 1797.
Originally destined for the US Navy as a turbo-electric (TE) type Buckley-class destroyer escort, HMS Calder was provisionally given the name USS Formoe.  However, the delivery was diverted to the Royal Navy before the launch.

Actions
HMS Calder served exclusively with the 4th Escort Group, earning battle honours for service in the North Atlantic.

U-1051 was forced to the surface by the use of depth charges. A gun battle then ensued, with U-1051 finally sinking after it had been rammed by HMS Aylmer. This action resulted in the loss of all hands (47) from the crew of U-1051.

On 8 April 1945 the submarine  was sunk in the North Atlantic south-west of Ireland, at position , by the frigates HMS Bentinck and HMS Calder. U-774 was attacked by the use of depth charges after its periscope was spotted by a lookout on HMS Calder. This action resulted in loss of all hands (44) aboard U-774.

General information
Pennant (UK): K 349
Pennant (US): DE 58

References
 The Captain Class Frigates in the Second World War by Donald Collingwood. published by Leo Cooper (1998), .
 The Buckley-Class Destroyer Escorts by Bruce Hampton Franklin, published by Chatham Publishing (1999), .
 German U-Boat Losses During World War II by Axel Niestle, published by United States Naval Inst (1998), .

External links
 Uboat.net page for HMS Calder
 Uboat.net page for U-1051
 Uboat.net page for U-774
 captainclassfrigates.co.uk

Captain-class frigates
Buckley-class destroyer escorts
World War II frigates of the United Kingdom
Ships built in Hingham, Massachusetts
1943 ships